John McCarthy is a paralympic athlete from Ireland competing mainly in category F32/51 club throw and discus throw events.

McCarthy competed in the club throw and discus throw at both the 2004 and 2008 Summer Paralympics, winning the silver medal in the discus in 2004.

References

Paralympic athletes of Ireland
Athletes (track and field) at the 2004 Summer Paralympics
Athletes (track and field) at the 2008 Summer Paralympics
Paralympic silver medalists for Ireland
Living people
Medalists at the 2004 Summer Paralympics
Year of birth missing (living people)
Place of birth missing (living people)
Paralympic medalists in athletics (track and field)
Irish male discus throwers
Club throwers